Hednota cotylophora is a moth in the family Crambidae. It was described by Turner in 1942. It has been recorded from Western Australia. It can also fly.

References

Crambinae
Moths described in 1942